"True Love" is a song by American rappers Kanye West and XXXTentacion. The song, which is a posthumous release for the latter, was originally released on West's album, Donda 2 (2022). For the single version, the album edit was revised. After Columbia Records announced its individual release on May 23, 2022, the label released the song to streaming services as the album's third single on May 27. A slow track that features synths, it sees West rapping and XXXTentacion crooning about their romantic turmoil.

"True Love" received lukewarm reviews from music critics, who were moderately positive towards West's vocals. Some praised the musical style, though a few critics found the song underwhelming. It reached number 22 on the US Billboard Hot 100, while peaking at number 19 on the New Zealand Singles Chart. The song charted within the top 40 in eight other countries, including Australia and Canada. It was included on XXXTentacion's compilation album, Look at Me: The Album (2022), and is played in the documentary film of the same name that focuses on his career.

Background 
Kanye West commented on XXXTentacion's death in June 2018, tweeting: "rest in peace. I never told you how much you inspired me when you were here. thank you for existing." The two first collaborated on the song "One Minute" from XXXTentacion's third studio album Skins, released posthumously in 2018. That same year, West played portions of his then-upcoming album Yandhi, featuring vocals from the rapper. West's track "The Storm" that featured XXXTentacion leaked online, which was ultimately reworked into "Everything We Need" for his ninth studio album Jesus Is King (2019), omitting the feature. XXXTentacion appeared posthumously on "True Love" for Donda 2, as well as "Selfish".

In February 2022, "True Love" was first played at a listening event for the album in Miami. The song went through several tweaks before the record's release and afterwards, more edits were undertaken for the single version. Its album version runs for 2 minutes and 40 seconds, while the single edit has a length of 2 minutes and 28 seconds. On May 23, 2022, Columbia Records announced the song would be released as a single on May 27. One day before the release date, it premiered via iHeartRadio. After having appeared on Donda 2, the song was revealed to be set for release on Look at Me: The Album, and it is played over the closing credits of the Sabaah Folayan-directed documentary film of the same name that focuses on XXXTentacion's career. The cover art was designed by West and features handwritten notes that were scanned from XXXTentacion's journal, which his mother found. Handwritten notes include "Am I supposed to pretend to be heartless?", "Love love love", and "A feeling you just can't explain".

Composition and lyrics

"True Love" was described by HotNewHipHop and the Financial Times as a slow track. The song begins as a light piano composition, before moving into a heavy drum beat. It features synths and a drum break that is identical to that of West's 2010 single "Runaway". XXXTentacion appears first, accompanied by melancholy minor chords. He croons the song's hook, which is followed by West rapping.

In the lyrics of "True Love", West raps about childcare arrangements between him and his wife Kim Kardashian under hostility after their divorce. He pleas for reconciliation by mentioning the children and makes accusations against Kardashian, including parental neglect, lying, and dressing their family incorrectly. West uses a line to reference XXXTentacion's son Gekyume Onfroy: "Daddy's not gone." XXXTentacion conveys sadness on the hook, singing of lost love.

Release and reception
On February 24, 2022, "True Love" was included as the opening track on West's demo album Donda 2, which was released exclusively on his Stem Player website. The song was made available on various streaming services as the third single from the album by Columbia Records at 12 a.m. on May 27, one day after the Hulu premiere of Look at Me. "True Love" was later included as the 14th and last track on the 2nd disc of XXXTentacion's compilation album Look at Me: The Album on June 10, 2022. Jon Powell of Revolt named the song as a Donda 2 standout and "a powerful cut", attributing this to the emotional nature and how XXXTentacion's vocals "beautiful[ly] match" West's rapping about subjects such as his family and his failed marriage with Kardashian. HotNewHipHops Alexander Cole declared that the "slow and melodic track" showcases West and XXXTentacion's "great chemistry", as well as demonstrating the late rapper "was a versatile artist who could take on a bevy of styles". Matthew Ritchie of HipHopDX highlighted the song's progression from "a delicate piano composition to a trudging drum beat" that would be appropriate on West's fifth studio album My Beautiful Dark Twisted Fantasy (2010), further noting how he airs out family frustrations. Ritchie elaborated that amongst "legitimate gripes" about relationship insecurities, West "sneaks in barbs about Kardashian's alleged parenting skills, getting uncomfortably personal". Exclaim! critic Riley Wallace said that West going after Kardashian and lamenting "the emotional, frustrating realities of co-parenting under hostility" is "a sharp juxtaposition" to the album's "much more menacing" track "Security", yet saw XXXTentacion's feature as filling in a glaring gap. Writing for The Daily Telegraph, Neil McCormick commented that West "kicks off about childcare arrangements", with the song including some of the "most sharply turned phrases" on Donda 2. He asserted that the song "swiftly degenerates into egotistic grumbles" about West's children wearing Nike shoes rather than his own brand's trainers, while XXXTentacion sings "weedily about lost love" over the chords.

In a mixed review, The Guardian journalist Alexis Petridis wrote that "True Love" "does everything it has to do" for the song's length: "mournful synth; mournful XXXTentacion sample; protracted whinge about Kardashian", though complained of too much synth at the halfway point. Petridis observed that West "sounds genuinely anguished" in his accusations against Kardashian, despite viewing the rapper "whining because he's spotted his children wearing a different make of trainer" as "pretty unedifying". Hunter-Tilney Ludovic was somewhat negative in the Financial Times, writing that West "raps woodenly[...], accompanied by a sad hook" from XXXTentacion. He also declared that the song has "a plangent atmosphere but dull dynamics" as it moves idley along like "splashing through puddles", while finding West's introspection to barely exceed the quality of a crying emoji. For Pitchfork, Alphonse Pierre felt that XXXTentacion's hook is "minor and unmemorable", seeing it as filler.

Commercial performance
Following its release as a single, "True Love" debuted at number 22 on the US Billboard Hot 100, with 12.7 million streams. It generated 1.8 million in radio audience from airplay and sold 3,000 downloads, entering the US R&B/Hip-Hop Digital Song Sales chart at number six. The song debuted at number five on the US Hot R&B/Hip-Hop Songs chart, becoming West's 39th top 10 on the chart and XXXTentacion's fifth. It lasted for three weeks on the Hot 100. On the US Rhythmic chart, the song opened at number 34 and eventually peaked at number 10.

In Canada, the song entered the Canadian Hot 100 at number 21. It was most successful in New Zealand, peaking at number 19 on the New Zealand Singles Chart. Similarly, the song reached number 21 on Australia's ARIA Singles Chart. It peaked at numbers 25 and 26 on the Irish Singles Chart and Topp 40 Singles in Ireland and Norway, respectively, while also charting within the top 40 in Lithuania, the United Kingdom, Denmark, and Switzerland. On the overall Billboard Global 200, the song debuted at number 22.

Personnel 
Credits adapted from Spotify.

 Kanye West performer, producer, songwriter
 XXXTentacion performer, songwriter
 John Cunningham producer, songwriter
 Mike Dean producer, songwriter
 Mark Williams producer, songwriter
 Raul Cubina producer, songwriter
 John Roger Branch songwriter
 Peter Phillips songwriter

Charts

Weekly charts

Year-end charts

References

External links 
 

2022 singles
2022 songs
Columbia Records singles
XXXTentacion songs
Songs released posthumously
Songs written by XXXTentacion
Kanye West songs
Song recordings produced by Kanye West
Songs written by Kanye West
Songs written by Mike Dean (record producer)
Song recordings produced by Mike Dean (record producer)